Lycée Français Antoine-de-Saint-Exupéry de Santiago (LAFASE) is a French international school in Vitacura and in Colina, both in Greater Santiago.

The school serves levels maternelle (preschool) through lycée (senior high school). It opened on 5 September 1959. The Chamisero campus had the first stone laid in May 2012. The campus officially opened on May 21, 2013 although the maternelle opened in February of that year.

References

External links
  Lycée Antoine-de-Saint-Exupéry de Santiago
  Lycée Antoine-de-Saint-Exupéry de Santiago

Santiago
International schools in Santiago, Chile
Educational institutions established in 1959
1959 establishments in Chile
Private schools in Chile